Adeline may refer to:

People
Adeline (given name)
Yves-Marie Adeline (born 1960), French Catholic writer

Places
Adeline, Illinois, village in Maryland Township, Ogle County, Illinois, US

Arts and entertainment
Adeline Records, recording label in the US
Adeline Software International, discontinued video game developing company situated in France
Ballade pour Adeline, 1976 instrumental
Portrait of Mary Adeline Williams, the title of two separate oil on canvas paintings by Thomas Eakins
"Adeline" (song), a song by British indie rock band alt-J

Other uses
Adelines, Adeleorina blood parasites of the families Adeleidae and Legerellidae
Cyclone Adeline, two tropical cyclones near Australia: 1973 and 2005
Pépinières Arboretum Adeline, commercial nursery with arboretum in France
 Adeline (rocket), a reusable rocket concept from Airbus

See also
Sweet Adeline (disambiguation)
 Adline Adline Clarke and Adline Castelino

ca:Adeline
nl:Adeline
vo:Adeline